Regal may refer to:

Companies
 Regal Beloit, usually referred to as Regal, an American manufacturer of electric motors
 Regal Cinema (disambiguation), several cinemas of that name
 Regal Cinemas, a major American theater chain
 Regal Cinemas (UK), a UK-based cinema chain
 Regal Entertainment, a Philippine film and television production company
 Regal Hotels International, a hotel operator listed on the Hong Kong Stock Exchange
 Regal Manufacturing Company, a maker of musical instruments in Indianapolis (1901–1904)
 Regal Musical Instrument Company, a maker of musical instruments in Chicago (1908–1954)
 Regal Petroleum, an oil company
 Regal Records (disambiguation), the name of several record labels
 Regal Theater (disambiguation)

Musicians
 Regal, a Spanish electronic music producer and DJ

Automobiles
 Regal (automobile), a United States automobile
 Buick Regal, a model of car produced by Buick
 Kia Optima Regal, a first-generation car model produced by Kia Motors
 Reliant Regal, a model of car produced by Reliant

Other uses
 Regal (cigarette), a brand of cigarettes
 Regal (instrument), a keyboard instrument
 Regal (Ulmus),  American hybrid elm tree
 Steve Regal (born 1951), retired American professional wrestler
 William Regal, a ring name of a British professional wrestler Darren Kenneth Matthews (born 1968)